Messier 96 (also known as M96 or NGC 3368) is an intermediate spiral galaxy about 31 million light-years away in the constellation Leo.

Observational history and appearance
It was discovered by French astronomer Pierre Méchain in 1781. After communicating his finding, French astronomer Charles Messier confirmed the finding four days later and added it to his catalogue of nebulous objects. 

Finding this object is burdensome with large binoculars. Ideal minimum resolution, in a good sky, is via a telescope of  aperture, to reveal its  halo with a brighter core region.

This complex galaxy is inclined by an angle of about 53° to the line of sight from the Earth, which is oriented at a position angle of 172°.

Properties
It is categorized as a double-barred spiral galaxy with a small inner bulge through the core along with an outer bulge. The nucleus displays a weak level of activity of the LINER2 type. Variations in ultraviolet emission from the core suggest the presence of a supermassive black hole.

On May 9, 1998 a supernova was observed in this galaxy. Designated SN 1998bu, this was a Type Ia supernova explosion. It reached maximum light on May 21, then steadily declined in magnitude. Observations of the ejecta a year later showed creation of 0.4 solar masses of iron. The spectrum of the supernova remnant confirmed too radioactive 56Co, which decays into 56Fe.

Messier 96 is about the same mass and size as the Milky Way. It is a very asymmetric galaxy; its dust and gas are unevenly spread throughout its weak spiral arms, and its core is just offset from the midpoint of its extremes. Its arms are also asymmetrical, thought to have been influenced by the gravitational pull of other galaxies within its group.

Messier 96 is being studied as part of a survey of 50 nearby galaxies known as the Legacy ExtraGalactic UV Survey (LEGUS), providing an unprecedented view of star formation within the local universe.


M96 group

M96 is the brightest galaxy within the M96 Group, a group of galaxies in Leo, the other Messier objects of which are M95 and M105. To this are added at least nine other galaxies.

This is the nearest group to the Local Group to combine bright spirals and a bright elliptical galaxy (Messier 105).

See also
 List of Messier objects

References

External links

 
 NOAO: M96 
 SEDS: Spiral Galaxy M96
 

Intermediate spiral galaxies
Messier 096
Messier 096
096
Messier 096
05882
32192
17810320
Discoveries by Pierre Méchain